The Mauritius ground thrush, Geokichla longitarsus, was a species of long-legged thrush within the Turdidae family. Endemic to Mauritius, the Mauritius ground thrush has since gone extinct, probably during the 14th century.

Description 
The Mauritius ground thrush is based on the holotype (MNHN MAD7127, MNHN MAD 7172 and MNHN MAD 8850), a subfossil specimen discovered by Etienne Thirioux before 2013 in the Vallée des Prêtres near Port Louis, Mauritius that consists solely of limb bones including a tarsometatarsus, humeri and tibiotarsi. It was similar in anatomy to the orange-headed thrush from Asia.

Extinction 
The Mauritius ground thrush was not mentioned by the early Dutch settlers of Mauritius who began to document the island's fauna and flora, starting in the 16th century, so it was likely extinct before the Dutch began to settle the island on 20 September 1598.

The leading theory towards the extinction of the Mauritius ground thrush is that it likely went extinct during the 14th century when Arab traders introduced black rats onto the island of Mauritius.

References 

Turdidae
Extinct biota of Africa
Fossil taxa described in 2022